Francis Ignatius Malone (born September 1, 1950) is an American prelate of the Roman Catholic Church who has been serving as bishop for the Diocese of Shreveport in Louisiana since 2019.

Biography

Early life and priesthood 
Francis Malone was born on September 1, 1950, in Philadelphia, Pennsylvania. On May 21, 1977, Malone was ordained to the priesthood by Bishop Andrew Joseph McDonald for the Diocese of Little Rock. His first assignment after being ordained was as parochial vicar of St. Michael Parish in West Memphis, Arkansas. He was later assigned to parishes in Crawfordville, Sheridan, Louisiana and Little Rock, all in Arkansas. He also served on the faculty of Mt. St Mary's Academy and served as both chancellor and vicar general for the diocese.

Bishop of Shreveport 
Pope Francis appointed Malone to become the third bishop for the Diocese of Shreveport on November 19, 2019. On January 28, 2020, Malone was consecrated as a bishop at the Shreveport Convention Center in Shreveport, Louisiana. Archbishop Gregory M. Aymond served as the principal consecrator. Bishop Anthony B. Taylor of Little Rock and Bishop Michael G. Duca served as co-consecrators.

See also

 Catholic Church hierarchy
 Catholic Church in the United States
 Historical list of the Catholic bishops of the United States
 List of Catholic bishops of the United States
 Lists of patriarchs, archbishops, and bishops

References

External links
Roman Catholic Diocese of Shreveport Official Site

 

1950 births
Living people
Clergy from Philadelphia
Roman Catholic Diocese of Little Rock
21st-century Roman Catholic bishops in the United States
Bishops appointed by Pope Francis